The James C. Twiss House is a historic house located at 298 N. Page St. in Aviston, Illinois. The house was built in 1907 for James C. Twiss, a prominent Clinton County farmer. Architect George Franklin Barber, known nationally for his mail-order house designs, designed the plans for the house, which Twiss selected from a catalog. The Queen Anne house is two-and-one-half stories tall with wood siding and a limestone foundation. A hexagonal tower and a large gable with patterned woodwork mark the front facade of the house. The house's wraparound front porch is supported by Tuscan columns; a small gable, also with patterned woodwork, tops the porch at the entrance. A recessed balcony with Tuscan columns is located on the second floor above the entrance.

The house was added to the National Register of Historic Places on February 17, 2010.

References

Houses on the National Register of Historic Places in Illinois
Queen Anne architecture in Illinois
Houses completed in 1907
Houses in Clinton County, Illinois
National Register of Historic Places in Clinton County, Illinois
Kit houses